Anthony Dharson (born 28 April 1960) is a Trinidadian cricketer. He played in one List A and four first-class matches for Trinidad and Tobago in 1983/84.

See also
 List of Trinidadian representative cricketers

References

External links
 

1960 births
Living people
Trinidad and Tobago cricketers